La Rosa is a village in Tuscany, central Italy, administratively a frazione of the comune of Terricciola, province of Pisa. At the time of the 2001 census its population was 258.

La Rosa is about 40 km from Pisa and 4 km from Terricciola.

References 

Frazioni of the Province of Pisa